The Last Drag is the third studio album by the Samples. It was released in 1993.

Critical reception

The Washington Post wrote that "the arrangements often possess a haunting guitar-woven beauty or nervous rhythmic energy that plays tricks with time, making the hour-long disc appear half as long." MusicHound Rock: The Essential Album Guide, however, panned the album, listing it as one to avoid.

Track listing
All songs written by Sean Kelly, except where noted.
 "Little Silver Ring"
 "Everytime"
 "Still Water"
 "Eatonville" (Andy Sheldon)
 "Streets in the Rain"
 "When the Day Is Done"
 "Taxi" (Kelly, Al Laughlin)
 "Carry On"
 "Conquistador" (Sheldon)
 "Misery" (Jeep MacNichol)
 "The Last Drag"
 "Darkside"
 "Nitrous Fall" (Sheldon) 
 "Prophet of Doom" (Sheldon)
 "Playground" (Laughlin)
 "Smile for the Camera"

Personnel
 Sean Kelly (Lead Singer, Acoustic/Electric Guitars)
 Andy Sheldon (Bass, Vocals)
 Al Laughlin (Keyboards, Piano, Organ, Vocals)
 Jeep MacNichol (Drums/Percussion, Programming, Vocals)

References

1993 albums
The Samples albums
What Are Records? albums